Mlázovy is a village and administrative part of Kolinec in Klatovy District in the Plzeň Region of the Czech Republic. It has about 90 inhabitants.

Geography
The Boříkovský Brook flows through the area. The ponds Malý u Mlázov and Váchovec are supplied by the brook. Malý u Mlázov was captured on the map from 1783.

History
The first written mention of Mlázovy is from 1360.

Sights
Church of St. John the Baptist
Mlázovy Castle
Cemetery chapel
Column with a statue of St. John of Nepomuk

References

External links

Populated places in Klatovy District